The University of Wisconsin–Milwaukee School of Education is an academic division of the University of Wisconsin–Milwaukee. It offers five undergraduate major, five master's, and 12 doctoral programs. It also offers the only four-year interpreter training degree in Wisconsin.

The school was ranked 86th nationally by U.S. News & World Report in 2011.

History 
The School of Education’s history is intertwined with the history of UWM. The school’s predecessor, Milwaukee Normal School, opened in 1885 to train teachers in downtown Milwaukee at 18th Street and Wells Avenue. In 1909, the Normal School moved to its new location, the Milwaukee Normal School Building (today’s Mitchell Hall on the UWM campus). The Normal School became Milwaukee State Teachers College, offering four-year degrees. In 1951, Milwaukee State Teachers College became Wisconsin State College (WSC), Milwaukee, with liberal arts degrees. WSC merged with UW Milwaukee Extension to form UWM.

Departments 

Administrative Leadership
Curriculum and Instruction
Education Outreach
Educational Policy and Community Studies
 
Educational Psychology
Exceptional Education
Urban Education Doctoral Program

Academic Centers
Center for Mathematics and Science Education Research
Center for New and Professional Educators
Early Childhood Research Center (ECRC)
Institute for Intercultural Research

Notable people
Martin Haberman, educator, university professor
Golda Meir, fourth Prime Minister of Israel, one of the founders of the State of Israel
Bruce Weber, men's basketball head coach at University of Illinois at Urbana-Champaign

References

External links
University of Wisconsin–Milwaukee School of Education

University of Wisconsin–Milwaukee
Educational institutions established in 1951
Schools of education in Wisconsin
1951 establishments in Wisconsin